Smart is the debut studio album by English Britpop band Sleeper, released on 13 February 1995 by Indolent Records. It was mixed by Stephen Street. The album's sleeve photo is of the Mercury Seven astronauts. A 25th anniversary deluxe edition was released in 2020 on both vinyl and CD. The CD version has 10 extra tracks.

Track listing
Credits per booklet.

Personnel
Personnel per booklet.

Sleeper
 Louise Wener – vocals, guitar
 Jon Stewart – guitars
 Andy Maclure – drums, percussion
 Diid Osman – bass

Production and design
 Paul Corkett – producer (all except track 3), mixing (tracks 5 and 8)
 Sleeper – producer, design
 Stephen Street – mixing (all except tracks 3, 5 and 8)
 Ian Broudie – producer (track 3), mixing (track 3)
 T&CP Associates – design
 NASA – cover picture
 Hulton-Deutsch – cover picture
 Ricky Futura – cover digitally remastered
 Kevin Westenberg – Sleeper photography

References

External links

Smart at YouTube (streamed copy where licensed)

1995 debut albums
Sleeper (band) albums
Albums produced by Ian Broudie
Arista Records albums